Sir Thomas Lee, 3rd Baronet (1687–1749), of Hartwell, near Aylesbury, Buckinghamshire, was an English politician who sat in the House of Commons almost continuously from 1710 to 1741.

Lee was the eldest son of Sir Thomas Lee, 2nd Baronet, MP and the brother of George, John and William. He succeeded his father in 1702, inheriting the family seat at Hartwell, near Aylesbury, Buckinghamshire.

Lee was returned unopposed as Member of Parliament for Chipping Wycombe at the 1710 general election. He was returned unopposed again for Wycombe in 1713 and 1715. At the 1722 general election he was elected instead as MP for Buckinghamshire. He did not stand at the 1727 general election but was returned as MP for Buckinghamshire at a by-election on 29 January 1729. He was elected again at the 1734 general election, but did not stand in 1741.

Lee married in 1720, Elizabeth Sandys, the daughter and heiress of Thomas Sandys of London and had two sons and a daughter. He was succeeded by his second son William.

References

1687 births
1749 deaths
People from Aylesbury
Baronets in the Baronetage of England
Members of the Parliament of Great Britain for English constituencies
British MPs 1710–1713
British MPs 1713–1715
British MPs 1715–1722
British MPs 1722–1727
British MPs 1727–1734
British MPs 1734–1741